Joel T. Lazarus was a prosecutor and then a judge in Florida who gave Lionel Tate a life sentence for a murder that Tate committed at the age of twelve.

Lazarus received his bachelor's degree from Babson College and an MBA from Columbia Business School.  However Lazarus did not like investment banking and so in 1974 started law school at Nova Law School (now a part of Nova Southeastern University).

Lazarus worked as an assistant state attorney from 1978 until 1993.  According to some, Lazarus's most notable case as a prosecutor was putting Kathy Willets and Jeffrey Willets behind bars for running a prostitution ring.  This case involved Ellis Rubin seeking to claim that Prozac created an unquenchable sexual appetite as a defense for Kathy Willets.

Another case that Lazarus was involved in was that of Eddie Lee Mosley. In the Mosley case Lazarus and fellow prosecutor, Carl Weinberg, negotiated a plea deal which resulted in no more jail time for Mosley after being credited for the time he'd served in pre-trial.  Mosley committed three killings as established by DNA testing, and likely four more murders after this plea deal. Lazarus stated he went for the plea deal because Mosley's victims were "prostitutes and druggies" and thus not good witnesses.  This assessment of the victims is not supported by court records, though. They were poor and African-American, but there is no evidence those victims were prostitutes or on drugs. In 1981 a jury did convict Mosley largely from the testimony of one of these victims that Lazarus said was unreliable. In 1984 Lazarus did bring a case against Mosley, this one involving a woman who admitted that she had entered into an agreement to get cocaine from him but denied that she ever consented to sex. Mosley was acquitted, but the judge over the case, Harry Hinckley expressed the view that this was just another escape by Mosley. In 1988, after being found unfit to stand trial for two more murders, Mosley was institutionalized for the remainder of his life in a mental hospital. He died on May 28, 2020, at Jackson Hospital in Marianna, Florida.

Lazarus was appointed a circuit judge for Broward County, Florida in 1993 by governor Lawton Chiles.  Besides the Tate case, Lazarus also handled the assault case against rapper Foxy Brown while a judge.  In 2007 he was the judge in the trial for corruption of Hollywood, Florida city councilor Keith Wasserstrom, and threw out some of the charges, for reasons that some claimed were not acceptable according to Florida Supreme Court directives. He retired on December 31, 2010, in part to avoid the governor being able to replace him.

Although retired, as of December 2013, he has returned on a part-time basis and sits as a senior judge over foreclosure cases at the Broward County Courthouse.

Sources

Babson College alumni
Columbia Business School alumni
Nova Southeastern University alumni
Florida state court judges
Florida lawyers
Living people
People from Broward County, Florida
Year of birth missing (living people)